is a passenger railway station located in the city of Koshigaya, Saitama, Japan, operated by the private railway operator Tōbu Railway.

Line
Sengendai Station is served by the Tōbu Skytree Line (Tōbu Isesaki Line), and is 29.8 kilometers from the terminus of the line at Asakusa Station.

Station layout
The station has two island platforms with two through tracks and two tracks on passing loops, with an elevated station building above the tracks and platforms.

Platforms

Adjacent stations

History
Sengendai Station opened on 15 April 1967. From 17 March 2012, station numbering was introduced on all Tōbu lines, with Sengendai Station becoming "TS-24".

Passenger statistics
In fiscal 2019, the station was used by an average of 57,414 passengers daily.

Surrounding area
 Takesato Housing District
Saitama Prefectural University

See also
 List of railway stations in Japan

References

External links

 Tobu Station information 

Railway stations in Japan opened in 1926
Tobu Skytree Line
Stations of Tobu Railway
Railway stations in Saitama Prefecture
Koshigaya, Saitama